Bloomfield Municipal Airport  is a city-owned public-use airport located two miles (3 km) southwest of the central business district of Bloomfield, a city in Davis County, Iowa, United States.

Facilities and aircraft 
For the 12-month period ending May 18, 2006, the general aviation airport had 4,868 aircraft operations, an average of 13 per day.

References

External links 

Airports in Iowa
Transportation buildings and structures in Davis County, Iowa